The Kvirike mosque is a congregational mosque in Adjara, an autonomous entity in southwest Georgia. It is one of the oldest surviving mosques in Adjara, dated to 1861. The building is abundantly adorned with decorative wooden carvings. The mosque is inscribed on the list of the Immovable Cultural Monuments of National Significance of Georgia.

The Kvirike mosque stands in the center of the eponymous village in Adjara's coastal Kobuleti Municipality. Like other early mosques in Adjara, Kvirike's layout blends the Ottoman influences with vernacular architectural elements of local Georgian villages. The mosque had a minaret and madrasa, both demolished by the Soviet authorities in the 1920s. Both external and internal walls as well as the mihrab, minbar, columns, and balcony, bear original elaborate incised woodwork. The mosque does not have a full dome but a recess with an inset carved medallion. The mosque was renovated in 2013 and is functional, reserved for Friday or holiday services.

References 

Mosques in Georgia (country)
Buildings and structures in Adjara
Mosques completed in 1861
1861 establishments in the Ottoman Empire
1860s establishments in Georgia (country)
Wooden mosques
Wooden buildings and structures in Georgia (country)